Sido Murmu and Kanhu Murmu were the leaders of the Santhal rebellion (1855–1856), the rebellion in present-day Jharkhand and Bengal (Purulia, Birbhum and Bankura) in eastern India against both the British colonial authority and the corrupt zamindari system.

Rebellion
Santals lived in and depended on forests. In 1832, the British  demarcated the Damin-i-koh region in present-day Jharkhand and invited Santhals to settle in the region. Due to promises of land and economic amenities a large numbers of Santhals came to settle from Cuttack, Dhalbhum, Manbhum, Hazaribagh, Midnapore etc. Soon, mahajans and zamindars as tax-collecting intermediaries deployed by British dominated the economy. Many Santals became victims of corrupt money lending practices. They were lent money at exorbitant rates when they never could repay then their lands were forcibly taken, they were forced into bonded labour. This sparked the Santal rebellion.

On 30 June 1855, two Santal rebel leaders, Sido Murmu and Kanhu Murmu (related as brother) along with Chand and Bairab,  mobilized about 10,000 Santals and declared a rebellion against British colonists.  The Santals initially gained some success but soon the British found out a new way to tackle these rebels. Instead, they forced them to come out of the forest. In a conclusive battle which followed, the British, equipped with modern firearms and war elephants, stationed themselves at the foot of the hill. When the battle began, the British officer ordered his troops to fire without loading bullets. The Santals, who did not suspect this trap set by the British war strategy, charged with full potential. This step proved to be disastrous for them. As soon as they neared the foot of the hill, the British army attacked with full power and this time they were using bullets. Although the revolution was suppressed, it marked a great change in the colonial rule and policy. The day is still celebrated among the Santal community.

Legacy

Sido Kanhu Murmu University is named upon them. Indian post also issued a ₹ 4  stamp in 2002 honouring them. There is also a Sido Kanhu Memorial Park in Ranchi, named in their honour. The Sido-Kanho Dahar at Esplanade in Central Kolkata is named after them.

See also
 Santhal rebellion

References

People from Jharkhand
Year of birth missing
1858 deaths
History of Jharkhand
Santali people
Sibling duos